is a city located in Saitama Prefecture, Japan. , the city had an estimated population of 147,166 in 66,516 households and a population density of 3300 persons per km².

Geography
Located in the Sayama Highlands of far southern Saitama Prefecture, Iruma is bordered by Tokyo to the south. The Iruma River flows through the city.

Surrounding municipalities
Saitama Prefecture
 Sayama
 Hannō
 Tokorozawa
Tokyo Metropolis
 Oume
 Mizuho

Climate
Iruma has a humid subtropical climate (Köppen Cfa) characterized by warm summers and cool winters with light to no snowfall.  The average annual temperature in Iruma is 14.1 °C. The average annual rainfall is 1481 mm with September as the wettest month. The temperatures are highest on average in August, at around 25.9 °C, and lowest in January, at around 3.2 °C.

Demographics
Per Japanese census data, the population of Iruma has recently plateaued after several decades of strong growth.

History
The area around Iruma was part of ancient Musashi Province and was noted for kilns producing Sue ware pottery in the Nara period and Heian period. During the Edo period, the area developed as a series of three post towns on the Nikkō Wakiōkan highway during the Edo period. The town of Toyooka and villages of Kaneko, Miyadera, Fujisawa and Higashikaneko were created within Iruma District, Saitama with the establishment of the modern municipalities system on April 1, 1889. The Imperial Japanese Army Air Academy established an airfield in the area in 1938, which later developed into Iruma Air Base.  On April 1, 1954, Higashikaneko became Seibu Town. On September 30, 1956, Toyooka, Kaneko, Miyadera, Fujisawa and Seibu merged to form the town of Musashi. Musashi was elevated to city status on November 1, 1966, becoming the city of Iruma. Discussions to merge with the neighboring city of Sayama in 2005 failed to pass a referendum. In 2017 Japan became the first country ever to elect an openly transgender man to any public office when Tomoya Hosoda was elected as a councillor for the city of Iruma.

Government
Iruma has a mayor-council form of government with a directly elected mayor and a unicameral city council of 22 members. Iruma contributes two members to the Saitama Prefectural Assembly. In terms of national politics, the city is part of Saitama 9th district of the lower house of the Diet of Japan.

Economy
Iruma has a mixed economy with numerous industrial parks for light manufacturing and also serves as a regional commercial center. Due to its location, it is also a bedroom community for people commuting to the Tokyo metropolis for work. In terms of agriculture, Iruma and neighboring Sayama are famous for the green tea they produce.

Education
Musashino Academia Musicae – Iruma campus
Iruma 16 public elementary schools and 11 public middle schools operated by the city government, and two public high schools operated by the Saitama Prefectural Board of Education. In addition, there is one combined private middle/high school and three private high schools. The prefecture also operates one special education school.

Transportation

Railway
 JR East –  Hachikō Line
 
 Seibu Railway - Seibu Ikebukuro Line
 ---  -  -

Highway

Military facilities
Iruma Air Base, located in Iruma and neighboring the city of Sayama is a facility of the Japan Air Self-Defense Force. The base holds an open house annually in early November. This airbase was formerly known as Johnson Air Base while under the control of the United States Air Force.

Twin towns and sister cities
Iruma is twinned with:
 Sado, Niigata, Japan (1986)
 Wolfratshausen, Germany, since October 14, 1987
 Fenghua, Zhejiang, China, friendship city since May 16, 2000

Local attractions
Iruma City Museum

Noted people from Iruma
Chihana Hara, rhythmic gymnast
Keisuke Ishii, professional wrestler
Wataru Kozuki, Takarazuka performer
Yūsei Matsui, manga artist
Junpei Yasuda, journalist
Shuichi Aso, manga artist

References

External links

Official Website 

 
Cities in Saitama Prefecture